This is a list of international news channels, categorised by continent.

International news Channel networks with channels in several languages

Other news channels aimed specifically at international audience 
 Georgia: PIK was a Caucasus-focused news channel broadcasting in Russian in 2010-2012.
 Japan: NHK World-Japan (English).
 Lebanon: Al Mayadeen is an Arabic channel associated with Syria's president Bashar al-Assad. Al-Manar is a Hezbollah-affiliated Arabic news channel. Al Jadeed also brands itself as a pan-Arab channel.
 South Korea: Arirang (English).
 Philippines: ANC is a 24-hour Philippine-based English-language cable channel owned by ABS-CBN, the largest media conglomerate in the country aimed at businessmen and Filipinos working abroad.
 Saudi Arabia: Al Arabiya is a Saudi-owned UAE-based pan-Arab television news channel.
 Ukraine: Jewish News One (2011-2014) was a privately owned Ukrainian news channel aimed at international Jewish audience, broadcasting in English and Russian. After the start of the war in Donbas the channel was rebranded as Ukraine Today with exclusively English programming. It ceased operations in 2017. Government-managed UATV started test broadcasts in October 2015; as of 2017 it produced news bulletins in English, Arabic, Russian, Crimean Tatar and Ukrainian. Non-profit Hromadske.TV runs its English programs as Hromadske International.
 US: Voice of America offers TV programming in numerous languages available online and aired as blocks by foreign networks. CurrentTime TV is a joint effort by VOA and Radio Free Europe/Radio Liberty to produce a 24/7 TV service in Russian. Alhurra is an Arabic-language state-funded satellite TV news channel. TV Martí is another American governmental TV service, broadcasting for Cuba in Spanish. Bloomberg Television is a privately owned international business news channel. Its Indonesian version Bloomberg TV Indonesia was functioning in 2013-2015.
 Pan-African: Africa 24, Presse Africaine, Africable (French), A24 news channel, Arise News, Africa Independent Television, TVC News (English).
 Portugal: RTP África is a pay television channel aimed at the Portuguese-speaking African countries, owned by the public broadcasting organisation of Portugal (RTP).
 RTVI is a channel oriented at Russian-speaking audiences worldwide, but unavailable in Russia.
 NTDTV is an international channel affiliated with Falun Gong new religious movement.
 Zee News is an Indian Hindi-language news channel owned by the Essel Group.

News/generalist channels aimed at citizens and relevant language audiences abroad 

Most of these are spin-offs of domestic channels, rearranged and refurbished for international broadcasting. All in respective national languages.

By annual budget

References

24-hour television news channels
International broadcasters